Topola is a town and municipality located in the Šumadija District of central Serbia. It was the place where Karađorđe, a Serbian revolutionary, was chosen as the leader of the First Serbian Uprising against the Ottoman Empire in 1804. The local St. George Church is the burial place of the Ducal and Royal Family of Serbia and Yugoslavia  (the Karađorđevićes).

The name Topola means poplar. Topola is famous for its yearly Oplenac vintage festival, attended by several thousand visitors each year.

Settlements
Aside from the town of Topola (5,422), the municipality includes the following settlements, according to 2002 census (population in brackets):

 Belosavci (1182)
 Blaznava (591)
 Božurnja (672)
 Donja Šatornja (800)
 Donja Trešnjevica (304)
 Donja Trnava (921)
 Gornja Šatornja (558)
 Gornja Trnava (1736)
 Gorovič (319)
 Guriševci (153)
 Jarmenovci (563)
 Jelenac (375)
 Junkovac (945)
 Kloka (1146)
 Krćevac (775)
 Lipovac (558)
 Manojlovci (144)
 Maskar (236)
 Natalinci (834)
 Ovsište (630)
 Pavlovac (70)
 Plaskovac (559)
 Rajkovac (189)
 Šume (595)
 Svetlić (417)
 Topola (village) (1363)
 Vinča (1176)
 Vojkovci (278)
 Žabare (1016)
 Zagorica (765)

History
The region was heavily settled after the Battle of Kosovo in 1389, seen in the many medieval cemeteries in villages of Topola. Despot Stefan Lazarević died and was buried in the nearby Crkvine hamlet. On June 20, 1459, the city of Rudnik fell to the Ottomans, situated south of Topola. A hamlet was named Despotovica in memory of the fallen Serbian Despotate. The region was further settled with the great migration of Serbs in the 17th century.

The town was destroyed during the First Serbian Uprising, when Kučuk-Alija ravaged the Šumadija region in 1804, also burning down Karageorge's house. The renovation began in 1805, when the town was renewed as a fortified city; Karageorge built a new mansion on the ruins of his previous house, and several buildings surrounding, they were all protected with palisades and peep holes, making Topola a strategic settlement. With the successful revolts, Topola gains a political importance. The Vožd further expanded the town, from 1808 to 1813 he built large walls, towers, konaks, a school, a church and many other buildings. Topola became the centre of Revolutionary Serbia, where Karageorge was seated.

In 1814, just when the city was finished, the Ottomans tackle the Uprising and Topola was seriously damaged, only ruins were left. Aleksandar Karađorđević, the son of Karageorge, renewed the city and settled people in a higher degree, streets were built with nicer buildings and shops. With the comeback of the House of Obrenović in 1858, Topola saw further development.

Demographics

Economy
Topola is an agricultural area and farmers are producing fruit, vegetables and breeding cattle.

The following table gives a preview of total number of registered people employed in legal entities per their core activity (as of 2018):

Tourism
Topola has the preconditions necessary for development of a tourism industry. Historical and cultural monuments (Cultural Heritage of Serbia) exist: revolutionary and royal (Karageorge's town), ecclesiastical (St. George's church, Nikolje monasteries). It is a wine region (Oplenac), and a large hunting ground Kamenica.

Visitor attractions

Oplenac, church and mausoleum of the Karađorđević (22 members), built 1910-2
Nikolje Monastery, built in 1425 by Nikola Dorjenovic
Karageorge's town, restored quarters of the 1810s revolutionary town
Karageorge's church (church of Our Blessed Lady)
Peter's house, King Peter's estate
King's villa, Karađorđević estate
Queen's villa, Karađorđević estate
Winegrower's house, former royal wine cellar, now gallery
Oplenac Wine region
Aleksandrović wine cellar
Kamenica Hunting ground, hunting region
Oplenac Vintage (Oplenacka berba) annual folk festival second weekend of October

Gallery

References

External links

 Official Topola Municipality
 Official Tourism Organization of Topola
 Official Topola Festival

Populated places in Šumadija District
Municipalities and cities of Šumadija and Western Serbia
Karađorđević dynasty
Historic sites in Serbia